Mess Lake Cone is a cinder cone in northwestern British Columbia, Canada. It is polygenetic in nature, having erupted more than once throughout its eruptive history. Mess Lake Cone is one of the volcanoes that produced young basaltic lava flows in the central portion of the Mount Edziza volcanic complex in the past 10,000 years. These basaltic lava flows form a north–south trending volcanic field called the Mess Lake Lava Field.

See also
List of volcanoes in Canada
List of Northern Cordilleran volcanoes
Volcanism of Canada
Volcanism of Western Canada

References

Northern Cordilleran Volcanic Province
Polygenetic volcanoes